Ludwig Külz (18 February 1875 - 1938) was a German colonial physician born in Borna. He was a twin brother to liberal politician Wilhelm Külz (1875-1948).

Ludwig Külz earned his medical doctorate in 1899, and became a doctor with the German Imperial Navy. From 1902 until 1912 he was a colonial doctor in Togo and Kamerun, where he was tasked with dealing with the problem of malaria.

With ophthalmologist Alfred Leber (1881-1954), he was part of a mission to German New Guinea (Medizinisch-demographischen Deutsch-Neuguinea-Expedition) in 1913–14. On this expedition was artist Emil Nolde (1867-1956), who created ethnographic paintings of New Guinea.

In 1915 he was promoted to senior medical officer, soon afterwards becoming a naval chief physician (1916).

His best-known publication is Tropenarzt im Afrikanischen Busch, a book that involved Külz's experiences with tropical medicine in Africa.

References 
 This article is based on a translation of an article from the German Wikipedia.

1875 births
1938 deaths
People from Borna
People from the Kingdom of Saxony
German military doctors
German twins
German tropical physicians